Watercolor Painting in a Rainy Day 2 is a 1993 South Korean film, the sequel of Watercolor Painting in a Rainy Day (1989).

Plot
Ji-su is finally released from jail and reunites with his stepsister Ji-hyeon. However his father had dark secret that neither of them knew before; both Ji-su and Ji-hyeon are half-siblings.

Cast
Ok So-ri
Lee Geung-young 
Kim Myeong-su 
Kim Seok-hun 
Kim In-moon 
Lee Nak-hoon 
Gwak Chan 
Park Cheol-gu 
Park Sang-ah 
Kim Ji-young

External links
 
 Watercolor Painting in a Rainy Day 2  Cine 21 (Korean)

Incest in film
South Korean romantic drama films
1993 films
South Korean sequel films
1990s Korean-language films
Films directed by Kwak Jae-yong